Alternatives for Community and Environment (ACE) is an environmental justice community organization based in Boston's Nubian Square (formerly Dudley Square). Founded in 1994, ACE works to eradicate environmental racism and classism and achieve environmental justice. Its four core program areas are the Dudley Square Organizing Project (DSOP), Roxbury Environmental Empowerment Project (REEP), T Riders Union (TRU), and Environmental Justice Legal Services (EJLS).

Accomplishments  
Some of ACE's notable accomplishments include the following:

In September 2009, youth members of REEP and TRU, in collaboration with the Youth Way on the MBTA, reached an agreement with Massachusetts Secretary of Transportation James Aloisi to extend the hours for student passes and investigate the feasibility of an unrestricted youth pass.
With partner organizations in the Green Justice Coalition, ACE and its Dudley Square Organizing Project helped ensure that environmental justice considerations were included in the landmark 2009 Massachusetts energy efficiency plan.
ACE's Environmental Justice Legal Services represented Chelsea residents in a 2007 case that prevented the construction of a diesel-fueled power plant adjacent to an elementary school.
In 1999, ACE worked with a number of governmental agencies to implement Airbeat, a real-time air pollution monitoring system.

References

External links 
 Alternatives for Community and Environment

Environmental justice organizations
Environmental organizations based in Massachusetts
Political advocacy groups in the United States
Organizations based in Boston